The  is an archaeological site in the Suwarashi neighborhood of Midori-ku, Sagamihara, Kanagawa Prefecture, in the southern Kantō region of Japan containing a late Jōmon period settlement trace. It was designated a National Historic Site of Japan in 1930.

Overview
Suara Stone Age Site is located on a fluvial terrace facing the confluence of the Sagami River and the Doshi River, which is now dammed by Lake Sagami. An archaeological excavation was conducted in 1928 after stones were found by a farmer plowing his fields, and the remains of a flagstone-floored Jōmon period pit dwelling was confirmed. The ruins, which were discovered in almost perfect condition, are estimated to be about 4500 years old and as the existence of such flagstone-floored dwelling in southern Kantō was regarded as rare at the time, it was designated as a National Historic Site in 1930. The main part of the building has a major axis of 4.3 meters and a minor axis of 3.3 meters, with an overhang on the east side with a width of 0.8 meters and a length of 1.4 meters. In the center was a hexagonal hearth with six large cut stones. The flagstones are flat stones with a diameter of 20 to 50 centimeters and the gaps in between are filled with small stones. 

Many relics were found in the ruins, including stone axes, stone tools, and Jōmon pottery. Currently the is site is preserved by a shelter and is open to the public The site is a short walk from the  "Tsukui Fire Station" bus stop on the Kanagawa Bus from Sagamiko Station on the JR East  Chūō Main Line.

See also
List of Historic Sites of Japan (Kanagawa)

References

External links

Sagamihara City home page 

Archaeological sites in Japan
Jōmon period
Sagamihara
History of Kanagawa Prefecture
Historic Sites of Japan